Forelius pusillus is a species of ant in the genus Forelius. Described by Santschi in 1922, the species is endemic to South America.

Behaviour 
Forelius pusillus is noted to perform "pre-emptive defensive self-sacrifice", where a group of ants leave the security of the nest after sealing the entrance from the outside each evening.

References

External links

Dolichoderinae
Hymenoptera of South America
Insects described in 1922